is a manga series by Eiji Ōtsuka with art by Mami Itoh.

Volume list

Reception
Manga Sanctuary called it a brilliant and complex story, and called it very gripping.

References

Further reading
ActuaBD review 
SF mag review 
Planete BD review 
Manga Sanctuary review 

Science fiction anime and manga
1994 manga